The 1981 Philippine presidential election and national referendum was held on June 16, 1981. President Ferdinand E. Marcos of the Kilusang Bagong Lipunan (KBL) defeated retired general and World War II veteran Alejo Santos of the Nacionalista Party in a landslide victory. Most opposition parties boycotted the election as a sign of protest over the 1978 election for the Interim Batasang Pambansa (National Assembly), which they condemned as fraudulent. At the same time, a national referendum was held on the question in holding elections for barangay elections in 1982.

Marcos' 80% margin of victory is the most lopsided Philippine presidential election ever, beating out Manuel L. Quezon's landslide victory of 64% in 1941. Marcos getting 88% of the vote is also the largest in Philippine presidential election history, also beating Quezon's 1941 record of 82%. This is also the most votes received by a person in the Philippines for a single-winner election until 2022 when Sara Duterte won 32 million votes; for multiple-winner elections, it was beaten by Mar Roxas in 2004 with 19 million votes. This was also the presidential election with the most number of candidates, with 13, although nine candidates with the fewest votes collectively just got 0.13% of the vote.

Marcos would have served another six-year term ending in 1987, but it was cut short by the 1986 snap election that eventually resulted in his ouster in the People Power Revolution.

Lifting of martial law 
On January 17, 1981, President Marcos announced the lifting of martial law via Proclamation No. 2045; in his address, he also inaugurated the "New Republic." Although martial law has ended, Marcos retained all presidential decrees, legislative powers and the suspension of the privilege of the writ of habeas corpus. The lifting of martial law was speculated to be due to the election of U.S. President Ronald Reagan, with whom Marcos wanted to have close relationship with and who was to be inaugurated only three days later, and the arrival of Pope John Paul II in the country. In February, the Interim Batasang Pambansa (parliament) passed a constitutional amendment that changed the parliamentary system of government to a semi-presidential modeled on that of France. The electorate approved the amendment in a plebiscite held in April. Marcos then called for a presidential election to be scheduled in June.

Campaign 
The opposition, as early as April, had decided to boycott the election. The United Nationalist Democratic Organization (UNIDO), the main opposition umbrella group, wanted to clean the voters' list, a revamping of the Commission on Elections, a campaign to be held nationwide and that UNIDO accredited as a minority party. Marcos did not accept the demands which led UNIDO to call for a boycott. This caused for Marcos to be reportedly dismayed as he could not legitimize the election without a viable opposition candidate. UNIDO also refused to participate as Benigno Aquino Jr. (who was in exile in Massachusetts) was not allowed to participate since only people fifty years old or older were allowed to participate (Aquino was 48 years old at the time).

Marcos instructed Nacionalista Party president Jose Roy to find a token candidate to oppose him. The Nacionalista Party was then a moribund political entity because Marcos, who was elected twice before under its banner, had alternately lured and coerced the vast majority its members to his new Kilusang Bagong Lipunan. The Nacionalista Party chose former Defense Secretary and Bulacan governor Alejo Santos as their standard bearer. Santos, who was appointed by Marcos as chairman of the board of the Philippine Veterans Bank, had Francisco Tatad, Marcos' former information minister, as his campaign manager. The other main candidate was Bartolome Cabangbang of the Federalist Party, whose platform was for the Philippines to become the 51st state of the United States.

With UNIDO pressing for a boycott, the government issued a statement that abstention was a mortal sin; the Archbishop of Manila, Cardinal Jaime Sin responded that the people "were free to exercise their moral judgment whether to vote or not." Those who did not vote on the April plebiscite were issued summons to force them to vote. Marcos won overwhelmingly, but with people remembering the American colonial era and wanting a change from the martial law conditions, Cabangbang surprisingly got 4% of the vote.

Results

Presidential election

Referendum on holding barangay elections

Summary

By province/city

Aftermath 

Marcos was inaugurated on June 30, 1981, at the Quirino Grandstand, with then-United States Vice President George H. W. Bush in attendance. This is when Bush made the infamous praise for Marcos: "We love your adherence to democratic principles and to the democratic process."

Barangay elections were indeed held on May 17, 1982.

On August 21, 1983, Senator Aquino returned from exile in the United States, but was assassinated at Manila International Airport. Growing unrest followed, and Marcos was forced to call the snap election of 1986, where UNIDO and Partido Demokratiko Pilipino-Lakas ng Bayan participated and nominated Aquino's widow Corazon Aquino as their standard bearer. Marcos claimed victory over Aquino despite reports of massive cheating, but he was removed from power a few hours after his oath-taking on February 25, 1986.

See also 
 Commission on Elections
 Politics of the Philippines
 Philippine elections
 President of the Philippines

References

External links 
 The Philippine Presidency Project
 Official website of the Commission on Elections

1981 elections in the Philippines
1981 referendums
Referendums in the Philippines
1981